Jeena Shin (born 1973) is a New Zealand painter. Her work is geometric in style, and often monochromatic. Many of her projects are large scale and painted directly on the walls of public galleries.

Early life and education 

Shin was born in Seoul, South Korea. Shin received a Bachelor of Fine Arts from the University of Auckland in 1997 and a Masters of Fine Arts from RMIT University, Melbourne in 2000. In 2011 she participated in the 'International Residency Exchange Programs' at the Art Studio of the National Museum of Modern and Contemporary Art in South Korea.

Shin is resident in Auckland, New Zealand.

Exhibitions 
In 2016 she was included in the exhibition Necessary Distraction: A Painting Show at Auckland Art Gallery Toi o Tāmaki. Notable exhibitions at Two Rooms (Auckland) have included Reflection Reflection (2012), Motus (2014), and Over Under Sideways Down (2015–6 with Selina Foote and Jan van de Ploeg). In 2009, she was commissioned to create a large-scale wall painting  x  at Dunedin Public Art Gallery.

Awards 
In 2014, Shin was the inaugural winner of the C Art Trust Award.

References

Further reading 
Artist files for Jeena Shin are held at:
 Angela Morton Collection, Takapuna Library
 E. H. McCormick Research Library, Auckland Art Gallery Toi o Tāmaki
 Robert and Barbara Stewart Library and Archives, Christchurch Art Gallery Te Puna o Waiwhetu
 Fine Arts Library, University of Auckland
 Hocken Collections Uare Taoka o Hākena
 Te Aka Matua Research Library, Museum of New Zealand Te Papa Tongarewa

External links 
Jeena Shin creating the work 'Movement Image Time. Te Papa'.
Jeena Shin website
Two Rooms

1973 births
Living people
21st-century New Zealand women artists
New Zealand painters
RMIT University alumni
South Korean emigrants to New Zealand
New Zealand people of Korean descent
University of Auckland alumni
New Zealand women painters